Endeavour Reef is a coral reef within the Great Barrier Reef. It is within the Shire of Cook, Queensland, Australia.

It was encountered by Lieutenant James Cook when HM Bark Endeavour ran aground there on 11 June 1770.  In his journals, Cook described striking the south-eastern end of the reef at 11pm after having passed just north of Pickersgill Reef about one hour before.

Philip Parker King described the region in his Voyages for the Survey of the Intertropical coasts of Australia Volume 2 following his expeditions between 1818 and 1820.  King described the reef as being "... nine miles long; it lies in a North-West direction; the north end, in 15 degrees 39 minutes South, bears due from the North-east Hope." and stated that there was a dry rock on the western edge "... in latitude 15 degrees 39 minutes 55 seconds."  It is probable that he was referring to Cairns Reef which is further to the north.

Hans Hass searched unsuccessfully for the cannons during several dives in December 1952.
In 1969 an underwater search discovered the six abandoned cannons, ballast and an anchor which had been discarded by the Endeavour crew in 1770 whilst attempting to refloat the ship.  A replica cannon is on display at the Australian National Maritime Museum in Darling Harbour, Sydney, while the six original cannons are on display at Botany Bay, Cooktown, Canberra, Philadelphia (US), Wellington (NZ), and London (UK).

References

External links
Gazetteer of Australia

Great Barrier Reef
Reefs of Australia